1929 in sports describes the year's events in world sport.

American football
 NFL championship – Green Bay Packers (12–0–1)
 Rose Bowl (1928 season):
 The Georgia Tech Yellow Jackets won 8–7 over the California Golden Bears to share the college football national championship
 Notre Dame Fighting Irish – college football national championship
 28 November – Ernie Nevers scores 6 rushing touchdowns for Chicago Cardinals against Chicago Bears

Association football
Ecuador
 Emelec of Guayaquil officially founded on April 28.
England
 The Football League – Sheffield Wednesday 52 points, Leicester City 51, Aston Villa 50, Sunderland 47, Liverpool 46, Derby County 46
 FA Cup final – Bolton Wanderers 2–0 Portsmouth at Empire Stadium, Wembley, London
Germany
 National Championship – SpVgg Fürth 3–2 Hertha BSC at Nuremberg

Australian rules football
VFL Premiership
 Collingwood achieves the only perfect home-and-away season in VFL/AFL history, but lose the second semi-final to  8.13 (61) to 18.15 (123)
 Collingwood wins the 33rd VFL Premiership, beating Richmond 11.13 (79) to 7.8 (50) in the 1929 VFL Grand Final.
Brownlow Medal
 The annual Brownlow Medal is awarded to Albert Collier (Collingwood)

Bandy
Sweden
 Championship final – IF Göta 5-1 Västerås SK

Baseball
April 16 - New York Yankees become 1st team to use numbers on uniforms
World Series
 8–14 October — Philadelphia Athletics (AL) defeat Chicago Cubs (NL) to win the 1929 World Series by 4 games to 1.

Basketball
ABL Championship
Cleveland Rosenblums win four games to none over the Fort Wayne Hoosiers
Europe
Italian club Virtus Bologna, officially founded.
France
Limoges CSP, was founded in Nouvelle-Aquitaine, on November 13.

Boxing
Events
 September — having successfully defended the World Light Heavyweight Championship this year against both Mickey Walker and James J. Braddock, Tommy Loughran relinquishes the title to fight as a heavyweight
Lineal world champions
 World Heavyweight Championship – vacant
 World Light Heavyweight Championship – Tommy Loughran → vacant
 World Middleweight Championship – Mickey Walker
 World Welterweight Championship – Joe Dundee → Jackie Fields
 World Lightweight Championship – Sammy Mandell
 World Featherweight Championship – Andre Routis → Bat Battalino
 World Bantamweight Championship – vacant → "Panama" Al Brown
 World Flyweight Championship – vacant

Canadian football
Grey Cup
 17th Grey Cup – Hamilton Tigers 14–3 Regina Roughriders

Cricket
Events
 Marylebone Cricket Club (MCC) organises the England tour of Australia in the 1928–29 season. England retains The Ashes, winning the first four Tests against Australia and losing the last for a 4–1 series victory.  But, ominously for England, a young batsman called Don Bradman makes his Test debut for Australia.
England
 County Championship – Nottinghamshire
 Minor Counties Championship – Oxfordshire
 Most runs – Frank Woolley 2804 @ 56.08 (HS 176)
 Most wickets – Tich Freeman 267 @ 18.27 (BB 10–131)
 Wisden Cricketers of the Year – Ted Bowley, K. S. Duleepsinhji, Tuppy Owen-Smith, Walter Robins, Bob Wyatt 
Australia
 Sheffield Shield – New South Wales
 Most runs – Don Bradman 1690 @ 93.88 (HS 340*)
 Most wickets – Clarrie Grimmett 71 @ 34.25 (BB 6–109) 
India
 Bombay Quadrangular – Parsees
New Zealand
 Plunket Shield – Auckland
South Africa
 Currie Cup – Western Province
West Indies
 Inter-Colonial Tournament – British Guiana

Cycling
Tour de France
 Maurice De Waele (Belgium) wins the 23rd Tour de France

Figure skating
World Figure Skating Championships
 World Men's Champion – Gillis Grafström (Sweden)
 World Women's Champion – Sonja Henie (Norway)
 World Pairs Champions – Lilly Scholz and Otto Kaiser (Austria)

Golf
Major tournaments
 British Open – Walter Hagen
 US Open – Bobby Jones
 USPGA Championship – Leo Diegel
Other tournaments
 British Amateur – Cyril Tolley
 US Amateur – Jimmy Johnston

Horse racing
England
 Champion Hurdle – Royal Falcon
 Cheltenham Gold Cup – Easter Hero
 Grand National – Gregalach
 1,000 Guineas Stakes – Taj Mah
 2,000 Guineas Stakes – Mr Jinks
 The Derby – Trigo
 The Oaks – Pennycomequick
 St. Leger Stakes – Trigo
Australia
 Melbourne Cup – Nightmarch
Canada
 King's Plate – Shorelint
France
 Prix de l'Arc de Triomphe – Ortello
Ireland
 Irish Grand National – Alike
 Irish Derby Stakes – Kopi
USA
 Kentucky Derby – Clyde Van Dusen
 Preakness Stakes – Dr. Freeland
 Belmont Stakes – Blue Larkspur

Ice hockey
Stanley Cup
 28–29 March — Boston Bruins defeats New York Rangers by 2 games to 0 in the 1929 Stanley Cup Finals

Lacrosse
Events
 The Intercollegiate Lacrosse League is renamed the U.S. Intercollegiate Lacrosse Association (USILA).

Motorsport

Nordic skiing
FIS Nordic World Ski Championships
 4th FIS Nordic World Ski Championships 1929 are held at Zakopane, Poland

Rowing
The Boat Race
 23 March — Cambridge wins the 81st Oxford and Cambridge Boat Race

Rugby league
The Australia national rugby league team embarked on the 1929–30 Kangaroo tour of Great Britain.

England
 Championship – Huddersfield
 Challenge Cup final – Wigan 13–2 Dewsbury at Empire Stadium, Wembley, London 
 Lancashire League Championship – Swinton
 Yorkshire League Championship – Huddersfield
 Lancashire County Cup – Wigan 5–4 Widnes
 Yorkshire County Cup – Leeds 5–0 Featherstone Rovers
Australia
 NSW Premiership – South Sydney 30–10 Newtown (grand final)

Rugby union
Five Nations Championship
 42nd Five Nations Championship series is won by Scotland

Snooker
World Championship
 3rd World Snooker Championship is won by Joe Davis who defeats Tom Dennis 19–14

Speed skating
Speed Skating World Championships
 Men's All-round Champion – Clas Thunberg (Finland)

Tennis
Australia
 Australian Men's Singles Championship – Colin Gregory (Great Britain) defeats Richard Schlesinger (Australia) 6–2 6–2 5–7 7–5
 Australian Women's Singles Championship – Daphne Akhurst Cozens (Australia) defeats Louise Bickerton (Australia) 6–1 5–7 6–2 
England
 Wimbledon Men's Singles Championship – Henri Cochet (France) defeats Jean Borotra (France) 6–4 6–3 6–4 
 Wimbledon Women's Singles Championship – Helen Wills Moody (USA) defeats Helen Jacobs (USA) 6–1 6–2
France
 French Men's Singles Championship – René Lacoste (France) defeats Jean Borotra (France) 6–3 2–6 6–0 2–6 8–6
 French Women's Singles Championship – Helen Wills Moody (USA) defeats Simonne Mathieu (France) 6–3 6–4
USA
 American Men's Singles Championship – Bill Tilden (USA) defeats Francis Hunter (USA) 3–6 6–3 4–6 6–2 6–4 
 American Women's Singles Championship – Helen Wills Moody (USA) defeats Phoebe Holcroft Watson (Great Britain) 6–4 6–2
Davis Cup
 1929 International Lawn Tennis Challenge –  3–2  at Stade Roland Garros (clay) Paris, France

References

 
Sports by year